O, Vrba is a key Slovene pre-war documentary film. Its first internal premiere took place in the beginning of 1942. Due to the cultural silence imposed in the Slovene Lands during World War II, it was released only in 1945 by the State Film Company. It is a short black and white film that shows the Prešeren House after it was opened as a museum, on the day when the authors found out about the German assault on Poland, reflected in a dark atmosphere of clouds traversing the Karawanks. The film reflects Förster's fine feel for light and composition. It contains voice recordings of the writer Fran Saleški Finžgar, who led the arrangement of the house, and of the poet Oton Župančič, who recited the Prešeren's poem O Vrba.

References

1945 films
Documentary films about poets
France Prešeren
1945 documentary films
Slovenian documentary films
Documentary films about Yugoslavia